Sandis Valters (born 31 August 1978) is a retired professional basketball shooting guard, who last played for BK Ventspils. He is member of Latvia national basketball team. His father is a former Soviet basketball star, Valdis Valters, and his younger brother, Kristaps Valters, also plays professional basketball.

Professional career 
He first played professionally in 1994, for BK Brocēni, where he won his first five Latvian league titles. In 2001, after Brocēni disappeared, Valters moved to their successor BK Skonto, where he spent two seasons. In 2003, Sandis signed with Germany's team TBB Trier, where he had great season. Next season he also started in Germany, playing for team from Wuerzburg, but later in 2005 moved to Ukrainie, where he finished season with BC Azovmash.

For the 2005–06 season Valters had offers from Greece, Israel and Russia, but he opted to return to the Riga, where he signed lucrative contract with then up-and-coming team ASK Rīga. Valters also served as the captain of team. His best season with ASK was in 2006–07 as he led his squad to Latvian league title, while Valters was named finals most valuable player. During that season Valters was selected in every tournament's All-Star game (LBL, BBL and FIBA EuroCup) that his club participated in.

In July 2008 Lithuanian powerhouse BC Lietuvos Rytas wanted to sign Valters, but ASK did not let him go. In early 2009 Valters had to leave ASK as the club went through financial problems, so he signed for the remainder of the season with the Italian team from Imola. An injury during the Eurobasket 2009 preparation game with Latvian national team forced Valters to miss the first half of the 2009–10 season. In January 2010 he signed with VEF Rīga, where he played for next two and a half seasons, winning two Latvian league championships. In one of those finals Valters was named as most valuable player.

On 19 September 2012, Valters signed a two-year contract with BK Ventspils. In his first season with Ventspils, he helped to win the Baltic Basketball League championship. At the end of the 2013–14 season, Valters won his 9th Latvian League championship.

International career 
Valters was a regular member of the Latvia national basketball team and has played in two EuroBasket (2005 and 2007) tournaments. One of his best games with the national team was in 2005 against Spain, when he erupted for 28 points, hitting six three-pointers, including buzzer beating three-pointer at the end of regulation.

References

1978 births
Living people
ASK Riga players
BC Azovmash players
BK VEF Rīga players
BK Ventspils players
Latvian men's basketball players
Shooting guards
Basketball players from Riga